Gibbodon cenensis is an extinct pycnodontid of the family Brembodontidae.  G. cenensis''' fossils are known from the Late Triassic strata of Cene, Italy.

It lived sympatrically with its close relative, Brembodus''.

See also

 Pycnodontiformes
 Prehistoric fish
 List of prehistoric bony fish

External links
 Bony fish in the online Sepkoski Database

Pycnodontiformes genera
Triassic bony fish
Triassic fish of Europe
Late Triassic fish